Scott Allison Woerner (born December 18, 1958 in Baytown, Texas) is a former American football safety in the National Football League for the Atlanta Falcons and the New Orleans Saints. He played college football for the University of Georgia Bulldogs. In the 1981 Sugar Bowl, Woerner intercepted a pass by the Notre Dame quarterback in the closing minutes of the game which sealed Georgia's national championship for that year. He still holds several return records at the University of Georgia.  He had the most kickoff return yards (190) in a single game (vs. Kentucky, 1977). He also holds the most punt return yards (488) in a season (1980). Woerner was drafted in the third round of the 1981 NFL Draft by the Falcons.  He played for the Atlanta Falcons during that 1981 season. In 1983, 1984, and 1985 he played safety for the Philadelphia Stars of the short-lived United States Football League. The Philadelphia Stars won 2 of the 3 USFL championships. The Sporting News selected him as a USFL All-League player both of those seasons.

See also
 List of NCAA major college yearly punt and kickoff return leaders

1958 births
Living people
Players of American football from Houston
American football safeties
Georgia Bulldogs football players
Atlanta Falcons players
New Orleans Saints players
Philadelphia/Baltimore Stars players